The MV Hayat N was a Turkish roro ferry that sank on September 15, 2008 23:30 local time (21:30 GMT) in the Sea of Marmara off Bandırma in Balıkesir Province, Turkey. Owned by Istanbul Lines, she was operated by Marmara N Denizcilik between the Marmara Sea ports Bandırma, Ambarlı and Haydarpaşa.

The vessel sank around 15 minutes after leaving Bandırma en route to Ambarlı, Istanbul Province. It was carrying 68 passengers and 28 crew with 73 trucks and two cars. One person was killed and five were missing. 89 of the survivors swam to shore or were rescued by fishing boats. 25 were admitted to hospitals. The cause of the sinking is thought to be that the ship was overloaded.

Aftermath 
Rescue operations, started immediately to search for the missing persons, were terminated on September 19 without any success.

Most of the 73 trucks were scattered  around the shipwreck.

The body of another missing person was brought to surface by divers on October 5.

Ships registry 

June 11, 2007  Ciudad de Burgos 
November 29, 1989 MOS Freeway
August 13, 1989 BOS Freeway
March 8, 1989 LUX Freeway
June 30, 1988 Burgos
August 19, 1985 Roll Vigo

References

2008 in Turkey
Maritime incidents in 2008
Maritime incidents in Turkey
Ferries of Turkey
Shipwrecks in the Sea of Marmara
1980 ships